Monica Behan is a singer / songwriter and entrepreneur. She is best known for her top ten hit "World Keeps Spinning" in 1997, on the album Behan Johnson. She began songwriting at age seven and performing live at sixteen, after high school she moved to New York city with her godparents, Abbie Hoffman and Johanna Lawrenson, who introduced her to the counter-culture movement and the venue Max's Kansas City.

As an entrepreneur, Behan formed the music-themed fashion label Goretti with Desiree Kohan.

In 2014, Behan suffered a snowmobiling accident which included broken bones and facial lacerations, avoiding plastic-surgery, she developed a line of skincare nutrients which she currently markets as Modicum.

Discography

Singles
 "World Keeps Spinning"

Albums
 Behan Johnson (1997)
 Ruby (2010)
 Right Where I Need To Be (2015)

References

External links 
 

American women jazz singers
American jazz singers
American women singer-songwriters
Year of birth missing (living people)
Living people
21st-century American women